T'aqañawi or T'aqa Ñawi (Quechua t'aqa separation, a group of separated things of the same kind, ñawi eye, "separated eye", Hispanicized names Tacañahui, Toccañahui, Tocañahui) is a mountain in the Andes of Peru, about  high. It is situated in the Puno Region, Melgar Province, in the districts Ayaviri and Umachiri. T'aqañawi lies near Ayaviri at a plain called Pampa T'aqañawi (Pampa Tacañahui).

References

Mountains of Peru
Mountains of Puno Region